"All at Once" is a song by Denver-based rock band the Fray and is the fourth track and fourth single from their debut album, How to Save a Life.

Music video 
The music video for the song premiered on VH1's VSpot Top 20 Countdown, and consists of live footage of the band playing the song, as well as miscellaneous footage of the band on the road. Footage was shot for the video at the band's June 23 show at the Tweeter Center in Mansfield, Massachusetts.

The video reached #6 on the VH1 Top 20 Video Countdown.

Chart performance 
Although the song had not yet been released as a single, it charted for national airplay, entering Billboard magazine's Hot Adult Top 40 Tracks chart in June 2007. The song lasted 18 weeks on the chart and peaked at #20.

Chart positions

References

External links
 The Fray's official site
 The Fray's VH1 Videos, including the "All at Once" video

2005 songs
2007 singles
The Fray songs
Songs written by Joe King (guitarist)
Songs written by Isaac Slade